Exeter Central railway station is the most central of the stations in the city of Exeter, Devon, United Kingdom. Great Western Railway manages the station and operates most services, as well as South Western Railway.

From 1860, when it was opened by the London and South Western Railway, until 1933, when it was rebuilt, it was known as Exeter Queen Street.

History

From 1 May 1861 it was also the terminus for trains on the new Exeter and Exmouth Railway.

Here the LSWR connected with the Exeter and Crediton Railway and over that line eventually reached Plymouth, Padstow, and  Most trains to these destinations changed locomotives at Queen Street and many had carriages added or removed too. A locomotive shed was situated at the station but it was replaced by a new maintenance depot at Exmouth Junction in 1887. The space was later used for enlarged carriage sidings; further carriage sidings were situated at the west end of the station beyond the Queen Street bridge.

The original station had just a single platform with two tracks which were covered by a large train shed. A second platform and train shed was added in 1874 and two sidings were laid to give a total of four tracks between the platforms. A fire damaged the original wooden buildings on the westbound platform in 1927 and work on rebuilding the station started in 1931. The train sheds were demolished and new brick buildings were officially opened on 1 July 1933 when the station was renamed Exeter Central. At this time there were four platform tracks – east-facing terminal platforms 1 and 4 and through platforms 2 and 3 – and two additional through lines in the centre of the station.

The entrance at the east end of the station from New North Road was closed in 1966. Goods yards had been provided on the north side of the line, both behind the eastbound platform and also on the other side of the Queen Street bridge. General goods traffic was withdrawn on 4 December 1967 but cement traffic continued until January 1980. The eastbound through line (the 'up through') was taken out of use on 9 November 1969, as was the 'down through' on 13 October 1984.

On 2 July 1984 the entrance from New North Road was reopened, and later a new ramped footbridge was installed to give direct access from there to the east end of both platforms. Sectorisation in the 1980s saw Exeter Central become the most westerly station managed by Network SouthEast but it was later transferred to Regional Railways sector which operated the services to Exmouth. Privatisation therefore saw it pass to Wales & West and then Wessex Trains.

Locomotive shed 
The three-track locomotive shed was sited to the east of the station on the south side of the line. Despite these alterations the space was too small to handle all the locomotives working in and out of the station so a new maintenance depot was opened at Exmouth Junction in 1887. A few sidings and the turntable was retained at Queen Street.

Description

The station is situated below road level to the east of Queen Street, where the main entrance is situated centrally in the  curved brick building erected in 1933 on the south side of the line. The ticket office is placed in the original 1933 booking hall, which leads via a passageway to the covered footbridge that spans the tracks parallel to Queen Street. Lifts are located near the steps down to the platforms, the first of which leads down to platform 2 which is used by all trains towards St Davids but can also handle trains in the opposite direction. At platform level the old Queen Street C signal box built in 1925 and taken out of use in 1970 can still be seen standing at the end of platform 3 between the footbridge and Queen Street. Beyond this the line can be seen dropping steeply at 1 in 37 (2.7%) and curving northwards towards the  St Davids Tunnel. The level areas alongside this line used to be a goods yard (on the right) and carriage sidings (on the left).

The wide and long platforms – they are long enough to handle 14-coach trains – are covered for most of their length by simple canopies. At the eastern end of platform 2 is the bay platform 1, although this is seldom used nowadays as most trains approaching from this end continue at least as far as St Davids. At the far end of the platform a ramp leads up to another footbridge and another entrance, again on the south side of the line, from New North Road.

Ticket barriers were installed in early 2011 at both the main entrance and the New North Road entrance.

Passenger volume

Comparing the year from April 2007 to that which started in April 2002, passenger numbers increased by  29%.

The statistics cover twelve month periods that start in April.

Services

Signalling

In the 1860s there was just a single track to the East but two tracks to the West; all the points and signals were operated on the ground. The first signal boxes were brought into use in 1875 when three controlled the extensive layout: 'Queen Street A' and 'Queen Street B' at the east end of the station, with 'Queen Street C' situated at the west end between the two platforms. These signal boxes were all closed in the 1920s. The C box was replaced by a new one at the west end of the eastbound platform on 13 September 1925. The A and B boxes were replaced by a new, larger box on the north side of the line beyond the New North Road bridge on 15 November 1927. This was named 'Queen Street A' and the C box was renamed 'Queen Street B'; six years later they were renamed again as 'Exeter Central A' and 'Exeter Central B'.

The B box was closed on 23 February 1970 and the A box was then renamed just 'Exeter Central'. This too closed on 6 May 1985 when control was transferred to the new panel signal box at St Davids. With this change came resignalling; the westbound platform 2 was signalled for trains to run in either direction as was the westbound line to St Davids. The signals are interlocked so that trains cannot start from either St Davids or Central until their route is clear right through to their platform at the other station; a feature replicated from the days of steam locomotives with less power or brakes than today's diesels when it was undesirable for trains to come to a stand on this steeply graded section of line.

Notes

See also

 Southern Railway routes west of Salisbury

References

Bibliography

  Pages 16 to 20 contain a track plan of the station and plans for modelling it.

External links
Video footage of Exeter Central Station

Railway stations in Exeter
Railway stations in Great Britain opened in 1860
Former London and South Western Railway stations
Railway stations served by Great Western Railway
Railway stations served by South Western Railway
DfT Category C1 stations